The 1977 Virginia Slims of Chicago  was a women's tennis tournament played on indoor carpet courts at the International Amphitheatre  in Chicago in the United States that was part of the 1977 Virginia Slims World Championship Series. It was the sixth edition of the tournament and was held from February 7 through February 13, 1977. First-seeded Chris Evert won the singles title and earned $20,000 first-prize money.

Finals

Singles
 Chris Evert defeated  Margaret Court 6–1, 6–3

Doubles
 Rosie Casals /  Chris Evert defeated  Margaret Court /  Betty Stöve 6–3, 6–4

Prize money

References

External links
 ITF tournament edition details
 Tournament draws

1977 WTA Tour
1977 in Illinois
Carpet court tennis tournaments
Ameritech Cup
February 1977 sports events in the United States